Livingston Lindsay (October 16, 1806 – 1892) was a justice of the Supreme Court of Texas from September 1867 to July 1870.

References

Justices of the Texas Supreme Court
1806 births
1892 deaths
19th-century American judges